Yannick Gagnon is a Canadian politician, who was elected to the National Assembly of Quebec in the 2022 Quebec general election. He represents the riding of Jonquière as a member of the Coalition Avenir Québec.

References

21st-century Canadian politicians
Coalition Avenir Québec MNAs
Politicians from Saguenay, Quebec
French Quebecers
Living people
Year of birth missing (living people)